The discography of Australian hip-hop dance and pop music group Justice Crew consists of one studio album, one compilation album, one video album, sixteen singles (including one as a featured artist), one album appearance and thirteen music videos.

Albums

Studio albums

Compilation albums

Singles

As lead artist

As featured artist

Charity singles

Album appearances

Videography

Video albums

Music videos

References

External links

Discographies of Australian artists
Pop music group discographies